"Cold" is a song written by American R&B/soul singer Maxwell and Hod David. The song is the B-side to his number-one R&B hit single "Pretty Wings", and released from his album BLACKsummers'night. Cold was released as a single on June 23, 2009, peaking to number-one on Billboard's Hot R&B/Hip-Hop Singles Sales and number-two on Hot 100 Singles Sales.

Although "Cold" failed to chart on Billboard Hot 100, it reached #62 on Billboard's Hot R&B/Hip-Hop Songs chart in July.

References

External links
www.musze.com

2009 singles
Maxwell (musician) songs
2009 songs
Columbia Records singles
Songs written by Maxwell (musician)